Tyler Maxwell (born April 13, 1991) is an American ice hockey player. Maxwell, being of Jewish faith, was born in Manhattan Beach, California., but hasn't played since the 2015-16 ECHL season with the Toledo Walleye, also playing with the Alaska Aces (ECHL) earlier in the season.

Playing career
Maxwell played major junior hockey in the Western Hockey League for the Everett Silvertips. He made his professional debut in the Austrian Hockey League playing with EC Red Bull Salzburg during the 2012–13 Austrian Hockey League season.

On June 23, 2014, after a successful season with HC Valpellice in the Italian Elite.A, Maxwell returned to the ECHL to sign a one-year contract with the Stockton Thunder.

On September 24, 2015, Maxwell's rights were traded from the Thunder organization to the Alaska Aces prior to the 2015–16 season.

Personal
He is separated at this time to Chanel Maxwell. Tyler and Chanel also have a son named Ryder and two daughters named Ivy and Everly, he has a sister Hyland. His mother Marcee Katz and his father Aaron Maxwell have been a huge support throughout his hockey career.

See also
List of select Jewish ice hockey players

References

External links

1991 births
Living people
Alaska Aces (ECHL) players
American men's ice hockey centers
Bakersfield Condors (1998–2015) players
Des Moines Buccaneers players
EC Red Bull Salzburg players
Edmonton Oil Kings players
Everett Silvertips players
HC Valpellice players
Jewish American sportspeople
Jewish ice hockey players
Ice hockey players from California
Ontario Reign (ECHL) players
Sportspeople from Manhattan Beach, California
Stockton Thunder players
Utah Grizzlies (ECHL) players